Henry George Smith (born 10 March 1956 in Lanark) is a Scottish former footballer, who played as a goalkeeper. He spent the majority of his career with Heart of Midlothian.

He made his debut for Hearts in a League Cup win over Airdrie at Broomfield in 1981.

He won three caps for Scotland between 1988 and 1992 against Saudi Arabia, Northern Ireland and Canada and was part of the Scotland squad at Euro 92. He was perhaps unfortunate to play during a time when Scotland had the services of Jim Leighton and Andy Goram, which restricted his opportunities at international level. Additionally, he played two matches for the under-21s as an overage player.

Smith played in the Home Nations Masters Tournament in March 2009. At 53 years of age, he was the oldest player in the tournament.

See also
 List of footballers in Scotland by number of league appearances (500+)

References

External links

Hearts Appearances at londonhearts.com

1956 births
Leeds United F.C. players
Ayr United F.C. players
Berwick Rangers F.C. players
Clydebank F.C. (1965) players
Heart of Midlothian F.C. players
Living people
Scotland international footballers
Scottish footballers
UEFA Euro 1992 players
People from Douglas Water
Scottish Football League players
Association football goalkeepers
Sportspeople from Lanark
Scotland under-21 international footballers
Anglo-Scots
Footballers from Yorkshire
People from Hemsworth
Footballers from South Lanarkshire